Amelia Cousins Greenhall is an American feminist tech blogger. She cofounded feminist tech blog and publication Model View Culture with Shanley Kane. Greenhall is co-founder and Executive Director of Double Union, a feminist women-only hackerspace in San Francisco, with Valerie Aurora, and is a Quantified Self enthusiast. Greenhall is the publisher and co-founder of Open Review Quarterly, a literary journal on modern culture (founded in September 2010).

Prior to co-founding Model View Culture in November 2013, Greenhall was a user experience designer, user interface designer and data scientist in Seattle. She left Model View Culture in May 2014.

Born in Hawaii and raised in Arizona, Greenhall is a 2009 studio art and electrical engineering graduate of Vanderbilt University in Tennessee. She went on to earn a master's degree in public health at the University of Washington.

References

External links 

 

Activists from the San Francisco Bay Area
American bloggers
American computer programmers
American feminists
Businesspeople from the San Francisco Bay Area
Computer designers
Feminist bloggers
Living people
People from San Francisco
Writers from Seattle
Third-wave feminism
University of Washington School of Public Health alumni
Vanderbilt University alumni
American women bloggers
Year of birth missing (living people)
21st-century American women artists